The fifth season of The Real Housewives of Atlanta, an American reality television series, was broadcast on Bravo. It aired from November 4, 2012 until April 28, 2013 and was primarily filmed in Atlanta, Georgia. Its executive producers are Lauren Eskelin, Lorraine Haughton, Glenda Hersh, Carlos King, Steven Weinstock and Andy Cohen.

The Real Housewives of Atlanta focuses on the lives of NeNe Leakes, Kim Zolciak-Biermann, Kandi Burruss, Cynthia Bailey, Phaedra Parks, Kenya Moore and Porsha Williams. It consisted of twenty-four episodes.

This season marked the final regular appearance of Kim Zolciak-Biermann.

Production and crew
Season 5 of The Real Housewives of Atlanta was revealed along with the cast and a trailer in October 2012.

The season premiered with a tell-all titled "Hairstylists Tell All" that centered on the hairstylist to the wives discussing the seasons before an hour long special that aired on October 28, 2012. The season officially began with "Got Sexy Back" on November 4, 2012, while the twentieth "Divas into Icons" served as the season finale and was aired on March 31, 2013. It was followed by a three-part reunion on April 7, April 14 and April 21 in 2013 and "Secrets Revealed" that aired on April 28, 2013, which marked the conclusion of the season.
Lauren Eskelin, Lorraine Haughton, Glenda Hersh, Carlos King, and Steven Weinstock are recognized as the series' executive producers; it is produced and distributed by True Entertainment, an American subsidiary of the Italian corporation Endemol.

While season 5 was airing, the second spin-off to The Real Housewives of Atlanta, Kandi Factory premiered on Bravo, starring Kandi Burruss. The series chronicles Kandi Burruss and her team at the Kandi Factory as she assists 16 aspiring artists trying to jumpstart their dreams of success in the music industry. The series is the second spin-off of The Real Housewives of Atlanta, following Don't Be Tardy. On August 30, 2013, Burruss confirmed that the series would not be returning for another season.

Cast and synopsis
Sheree Whitfield exited the series upon the conclusion of the fourth season, due to no longer wanting to be a part of the fighting and drama. Two new wives, Kenya Moore and Porsha Williams, were introduced in the fifth season. As the fifth season introduced former Miss USA Moore and football player Kordell Stewart's wife Williams, Leakes reconciled with Gregg and pondered the possibility of remarrying him. Zolciak was forced to move out of her mansion, which she and Biermann had attempted to purchase less than a year earlier, Leakes began to question Moore's seemingly unfaithful behavior towards her boyfriend Walter during a group trip to Anguilla, which began a feud between Leakes and Williams against Moore. Moore wished to marry Walter although their relationship had begun to deteriorate, while Parks and Moore created competing workout DVDs after plans to make the project a joint venture proved unsuccessful. Toward the end of the season, Williams attempted to revive her failing marriage to Stewart with therapist sessions. Episode 6 saw Kim Zolciak departing from the series, due to no longer wanting to participate in events with the group, and to focus on her own series Don't Be Tardy. The departure of Zolciak made Leakes the only remaining original cast member as of season six.

 During the second segment of the reunion, Moore moves down a seat so Zolciak can sit next to Andy during her appearance.

Episodes

References

External links

2012 American television seasons
2013 American television seasons
Atlanta (season 5)